Scouthead is a village in the civil parish of Saddleworth in the Metropolitan Borough of Oldham, in Greater Manchester, England. It is traversed by the A62 road, and occupies a hillside amongst the Pennines.

Historically a part of the West Riding of Yorkshire, Scouthead stands on the old Wool Road between Lancashire and Yorkshire and contains several hostelries which were once important staging posts along the road. Scouthead hosts an annual band contest on Whit Friday.

Scouthead occupies outlying land to the east of the Waterhead area of Oldham, and Austerlands area of Saddleworth. For purposes of the Office for National Statistics, Scouthead forms the eastern fringe of the Greater Manchester Urban Area.

Transport
The 350 is the main bus service running through Scouthead. It runs from Oldham bus station to Ashton bus station via Saddleworth, covering its major roads and villages. The service runs every half an hour Monday to Saturday, and every hour on Sunday.
A more minor service is the 82, which starts at Uppermill and ends at Manchester Piccadilly Gardens. This only runs at rush - hour times, and runs for people in the villages of Delph, Scouthead and Springhead, as the main Manchester services, 180 and 184, don't cover them. The 353 running from Ashton to Delph was once extended to Oldham in the evenings, but because the 350 runs now more frequently, this stopped to run to Delph only as part of the major revision services in 2004.

References

Villages in Greater Manchester
Geography of the Metropolitan Borough of Oldham
Saddleworth